William Wadsworth Wirtz (October 5, 1929 – September 26, 2007) was the chief executive officer and controlling shareholder of the family-owned Wirtz Corporation. He was best known as the owner of the Chicago Blackhawks of the National Hockey League, who are part of Wirtz Corp's holdings. Wirtz also served as the Blackhawks' team president for over four decades.

Biography

Early life
Wirtz was raised in Chicago, Illinois by his father Arthur Wirtz and mother Virginia. He attended the Latin School of Chicago where he was a star athlete in Football and Track. He was set to go to Princeton University after his senior year but decided to attend Brown University instead with his best friend. Wirtz graduated from Brown University In 1950.

Wealth
Wirtz (via his stake in the Wirtz Corporation) was most notable as owner of the Chicago Blackhawks; Wirtz Realty, a large real estate owner in Chicago; and Judge & Dolph Ltd., a major liquor distributor selling over 33 percent of all liquor in Illinois. Wirtz Corp. also has interests in banking and insurance, and co-owned the United Center with Jerry Reinsdorf. Crain's Chicago Business in 2004 estimated the company's 2003 revenue as US$1.3 billion. Overall, it is estimated that Bill Wirtz's personal holdings (including stock in several companies, including Alberto-Culver and Firstar Bank) were worth about US$3 to $4 billion.

Wirtz sold the Holiday on Ice and Ice Follies for $12 million to Irvin & Kenneth Feld Productions in 1979.

Blackhawks ownership
Bill Wirtz was the team president of the Blackhawks for 41 years and served as Chairman of the Board of Governors of the NHL for 18, helping to merge the NHL and the World Hockey Association during the 1970s.

As owner of the Blackhawks, Wirtz had a reputation for stubbornness and frugality, earning the nickname "Dollar" Bill. He was vilified by Blackhawks fans for forbidding home games to be televised unless they were picked up by national broadcasters, which only happened when the Blackhawks made the playoffs. As Wirtz explained it, broadcasting regular-season home games was unfair to season-ticket holders. For a short time during the 1991–92 and 1992–93 seasons, Wirtz introduced Hawkvision, a pay-per-view service that operated in conjunction with Chicago's local SportsChannel outfit, which cost $29.95 per month and broadcast Blackhawks home games.

Wirtz was also blamed for allowing Bobby Hull to leave the Blackhawks and the NHL for the World Hockey Association (although his father, Arthur Wirtz, was actually responsible for that decision). Wirtz was further blamed for the loss of both Dominik Hašek and Ed Belfour, for trading Denis Savard in 1990, for the trade of Chris Chelios to Detroit (in actuality, Chelios had asked to be traded and gave approval to then-General Manager Bob Murray when told Detroit was the most interested team), for the trading of Jeremy Roenick, and for the 1967 trade of Phil Esposito. Wirtz was also blamed for the Blackhawks' Stanley Cup drought, which was the third longest in NHL history and the longest in team history. Under the ownership of Wirtz, the Chicago Blackhawks were named by ESPN in 2004 as the worst franchise in sports.
In 2002, ESPN ranked Wirtz as the third greediest owner in all of sports.

In spite of his vocal critics, Wirtz was inducted into the Hockey Hall of Fame in 1976 and the United States Hockey Hall of Fame in 1985. He was considered by many (including former Blackhawks General Manager Dale Tallon, retired hockey star Stan Mikita, and former Blackhawk Martin Lapointe) to be a generous and fiercely loyal man. In 1993, he established Blackhawk Charities which has donated millions of dollars to the Boys and Girls Clubs and the Amateur Hockey Association of Illinois, among other groups.

Wirtz also served on the Olympic Committees for both the 1980 and 1984 Winter Olympics.

"The Wirtz Law"
In 1999, the Illinois State Legislature passed the Wine and Spirits Fair Dealing Act, ("The Wirtz Law"). The bill was passed after more than $700,000 was contributed to politicians by liquor distributors according to the Illinois Campaign for Political Reform. The law was on the books for less than three years before a U.S. district court judge struck it down on the grounds that it violated the commerce clause of the Constitution. Newspaper editorials at the time often called the Wirtz Law a corrupt document, and it has since become a case study for campaign finance reform.

Personal life and death

In 1950, Wirtz married Joan Roney. They had five children: two sons, Rocky Wirtz and Peter Wirtz; and three daughters, Gail Wirtz Costello, Karey Wirtz Fix, and Alyson Wirtz. Joan died in 1983, the same year his father died. In 1987, he married Alice Wirtz. Bill Wirtz died at Evanston Hospital on September 26, 2007, following a brief battle with cancer. His son Peter Wirtz was named the new owner of the Blackhawks the following day; Peter Wirtz eventually passed responsibility to his brother Rocky. Services were held at the Fourth Presbyterian Church in Chicago. During a tribute and moment of silence for Bill Wirtz during the Blackhawks' home opener on October 6, 2007, the crowd booed the proceedings.

See also
List of members of the United States Hockey Hall of Fame

References

External links

1929 births
2007 deaths
Brown University alumni
Deaths from cancer in Illinois
Chicago Blackhawks executives
Latin School of Chicago alumni
Lester Patrick Trophy recipients
National Hockey League executives
National Hockey League owners
Sportspeople from Chicago
United States Hockey Hall of Fame inductees
American Presbyterians
Hockey Hall of Fame inductees